Badenweiler may refer to:
Badenweiler, spa community in Germany
Badenweiler Marsch, military march
Badonviller, town and commune in France